Aethelheard may refer to:

Æthelheard of Wessex, monarch of Wessex
Æthelheard of the Hwicce, monarch of the Hwicce
Æthelheard of Winchester, 8th century bishop of Winchester
Æthelhard 8th/9th century, Bishop of Winchester and Archbishop of Canterbury
Æthelgeard, landowner of Winchester and official during the reign of Eadwig in the 950s